Count Franz Anton von Kolowrat-Liebsteinsky (31 January 1778 – 4 April 1861) was Bohemian noble and Austrian statesman from the House of Kolowrat. As a moderate liberal politician, he was one of the major opponents of State Chancellor Prince Klemens von Metternich during the Vormärz era. In the March Revolution of 1848, Kolowrat became the first constitutional Minister-President of Austria; however, he resigned after one month in office.

Life
He was born and raised in the Bohemian capital Prague, a scion of the Bohemian family of high nobility (the House of Kolowrat), whose ancestors had already served under the Luxembourg emperor Charles IV. Having finished his studies at Charles University, Franz Anton entered the Austrian civil service at the Beroun district administration in January 1799. During the Napoleonic Wars he achieved the office of a stadtholder of the Habsburg emperor Francis I of Austria at Prague and in 1810 became  Oberstburggraf of the Bohemian kingdom. Contrary to Chancellor Metternich, he encouraged Czech cultural and civic-national movements, exemplified by the founding of the Prague National Museum in 1818.

Kolowrat's rivalry with Metternich intensified when in 1826 the emperor called him to Vienna, where he was elevated to lead the Austrian State Council responsible for the Interior and Finances. The tensions between him and the chancellor continued: while Metternich favored a strong army, Kolowrat reduced the military budget. After the accession of Francis' incapable son Ferdinand I to the throne in 1835, Kolowrat together with Metternich led the Secret State Conference, the de facto government of the Empire from 1836 to 1848. However, the continuous disagreement between the two leaders palsied the Austrian politics and ultimately contributed to collapse of the "Metternich system".

Upon the outbreak of the Revolutions of 1848, Metternich had to resign. A ministers' conference was established and Kolowrat assumed the newly created office of an Austrian minister-president, which he nevertheless laid down after only one month between 3–5 April, officially for health reasons.

Kolowrat retired to private life; he died in Vienna aged 83. With his death, the Liebsteinsky branch of the Kolowrat dynasty became extinct.

Decorations
 Order of the Golden Fleece
 Order of Leopold
 Order of St. Andrew
 Order of St. Anna
 Order of St. Vladimir
 Order of the White Eagle
 Order of Alexander Nevsky
 Venerable Order of Saint John

References

External links

1778 births
1861 deaths
19th-century Ministers-President of Austria
Politicians from Prague
Bohemian nobility
Knights of the Golden Fleece of Austria
Charles University alumni